In mathematical optimization, Dantzig's simplex algorithm (or simplex method) is a popular algorithm for linear programming.

The name of the algorithm is derived from the concept of a simplex and was suggested by T. S. Motzkin. Simplices are not actually used in the method, but one interpretation of it is that it operates on simplicial cones, and these become proper simplices with an additional constraint. The simplicial cones in question are the corners (i.e., the neighborhoods of the vertices) of a geometric object called a polytope. The shape of this polytope is defined by the constraints applied to the objective function.

History 
George Dantzig worked on planning methods for the US Army Air Force during World War II using a desk calculator. During 1946 his colleague challenged him to mechanize the planning process to distract him from taking another job. Dantzig formulated the problem as linear inequalities inspired by the work of Wassily Leontief, however, at that time he didn't include an objective as part of his formulation. Without an objective, a vast number of solutions can be feasible, and therefore to find the "best" feasible solution, military-specified "ground rules" must be used that describe how goals can be achieved as opposed to specifying a goal itself. Dantzig's core insight was to realize that most such ground rules can be translated into a linear objective function that needs to be maximized. Development of the simplex method was evolutionary and happened over a period of about a year.

After Dantzig included an objective function as part of his formulation during mid-1947, the problem was mathematically more tractable. Dantzig realized that one of the unsolved problems that he had mistaken as homework in his professor Jerzy Neyman's class (and actually later solved), was applicable to finding an algorithm for linear programs. This problem involved finding the existence of Lagrange multipliers for general linear programs over a continuum of variables, each bounded between zero and one, and satisfying linear constraints expressed in the form of Lebesgue integrals. Dantzig later published his "homework" as a thesis to earn his doctorate. The column geometry used in this thesis gave Dantzig insight that made him believe that the Simplex method would be very efficient.

Overview 

The simplex algorithm operates on linear programs in the canonical form

maximize 

There is a straightforward process to convert any linear program into one in standard form, so using this form of linear programs results in no loss of generality.

An extreme point or vertex of this polytope is known as basic feasible solution (BFS).

It can be shown that for a linear program in standard form, if the objective function has a maximum value on the feasible region, then it has this value on (at least) one of the extreme points. This in itself reduces the problem to a finite computation since there is a finite number of extreme points, but the number of extreme points is unmanageably large for all but the smallest linear programs.
 
It can also be shown that, if an extreme point is not a maximum point of the objective function, then there is an edge containing the point so that the value of the objective function is strictly increasing on the edge moving away from the point. If the edge is finite, then the edge connects to another extreme point where the objective function has a greater value, otherwise the objective function is unbounded above on the edge and the linear program has no solution. The simplex algorithm applies this insight by walking along edges of the polytope to extreme points with greater and greater objective values. This continues until the maximum value is reached, or an unbounded edge is visited (concluding that the problem has no solution). The algorithm always terminates because the number of vertices in the polytope is finite; moreover since we jump between vertices always in the same direction (that of the objective function), we hope that the number of vertices visited will be small.

The solution of a linear program is accomplished in two steps. In the first step, known as Phase I, a starting extreme point is found. Depending on the nature of the program this may be trivial, but in general it can be solved by applying the simplex algorithm to a modified version of the original program. The possible results of Phase I are either that a basic feasible solution is found or that the feasible region is empty. In the latter case the linear program is called infeasible. In the second step, Phase II, the simplex algorithm is applied using the basic feasible solution found in Phase I as a starting point. The possible results from Phase II are either an optimum basic feasible solution or an infinite edge on which the objective function is unbounded above.

Standard form
The transformation of a linear program to one in standard form may be accomplished as follows. First, for each variable with a lower bound other than 0, a new variable is introduced representing the difference between the variable and bound. The original variable can then be eliminated by substitution. For example, given the constraint

a new variable, is introduced with 

The second equation may be used to eliminate  from the linear program. In this way, all lower bound constraints may be changed to non-negativity restrictions.

Second, for each remaining inequality constraint, a new variable, called a slack variable, is introduced to change the constraint to an equality constraint. This variable represents the difference between the two sides of the inequality and is assumed to be non-negative. For example, the inequalities

are replaced with

It is much easier to perform algebraic manipulation on inequalities in this form. In inequalities where ≥ appears such as the second one, some authors refer to the variable introduced as a  surplus variable.

Third, each unrestricted variable is eliminated from the linear program. This can be done in two ways, one is by solving for the variable in one of the equations in which it appears and then eliminating the variable by substitution. The other is to replace the variable with the difference of two restricted variables. For example, if  is unrestricted then write

The equation may be used to eliminate  from the linear program.

When this process is complete the feasible region will be in the form

This results in no loss of generality since otherwise either the system  has redundant equations which can be dropped, or the system is inconsistent and the linear program has no solution.

Simplex tableau
A linear program in standard form can be represented as a tableau of the form 

The first row defines the objective function and the remaining rows specify the constraints. The zero in the first column represents the zero vector of the same dimension as vector b (different authors use different conventions as to the exact layout). If the columns of A can be rearranged so that it contains the identity matrix of order p (the number of rows in A) then the tableau is said to be in canonical form. The variables corresponding to the columns of the identity matrix are called basic variables while the remaining variables are called nonbasic or free variables. If the values of the nonbasic variables are set to 0, then the values of the basic variables are easily obtained as entries in b and this solution is a basic feasible solution. Each row will have  column with value ,  columns with coefficients , and the remaining columns with some other coefficients (these other variables represent our non-basic variables).

Conversely, given a basic feasible solution, the columns corresponding to the nonzero variables can be expanded to a nonsingular matrix. If the corresponding tableau is multiplied by the inverse of this matrix then the result is a tableau in canonical form.

Let 

be a tableau in canonical form. Additional row-addition transformations can be applied to remove the coefficients  from the objective function. This process is called pricing out and results in a canonical tableau

where zB is the value of the objective function at the corresponding basic feasible solution. The updated coefficients, also known as relative cost coefficients, are the rates of change of the objective function with respect to the nonbasic variables.

Pivot operations
The geometrical operation of moving from a basic feasible solution to an adjacent basic feasible solution is implemented as a pivot operation. First, a nonzero pivot element is selected in a nonbasic column. The row containing this element is multiplied by its reciprocal to change this element to 1, and then multiples of the row are added to the other rows to change the other entries in the column to 0. The result is that, if the pivot element is in a row r, then the column becomes the r-th column of the identity matrix. The variable for this column is now a basic variable, replacing the variable which corresponded to the r-th column of the identity matrix before the operation. In effect, the variable corresponding to the pivot column enters the set of basic variables and is called the entering variable, and the variable being replaced leaves the set of basic variables and is called the leaving variable. The tableau is still in canonical form but with the set of basic variables changed by one element.

Algorithm
Let a linear program be given by a canonical tableau. The simplex algorithm proceeds by performing successive pivot operations each of which give an improved basic feasible solution; the choice of pivot element at each step is largely determined by the requirement that this pivot improves the solution.

Entering variable selection
Since the entering variable will, in general, increase from 0 to a positive number, the value of the objective function will decrease if the derivative of the objective function with respect to this variable is negative. Equivalently, the value of the objective function is increased if the pivot column is selected so that the corresponding entry in the objective row of the tableau is positive.

If there is more than one column so that the entry in the objective row is positive then the choice of which one to add to the set of basic variables is somewhat arbitrary and several entering variable choice rules such as Devex algorithm have been developed.

If all the entries in the objective row are less than or equal to 0 then no choice of entering variable can be made and the solution is in fact optimal. It is easily seen to be optimal since the objective row now corresponds to an equation of the form 

By changing the entering variable choice rule so that it selects a column where the entry in the objective row is negative, the algorithm is changed so that it finds the minimum of the objective function rather than the maximum.

Leaving variable selection
Once the pivot column has been selected, the choice of pivot row is largely determined by the requirement that the resulting solution be feasible. First, only positive entries in the pivot column are considered since this guarantees that the value of the entering variable will be nonnegative. If there are no positive entries in the pivot column then the entering variable can take any non-negative value with the solution remaining feasible. In this case the objective function is unbounded below and there is no minimum.

Next, the pivot row must be selected so that all the other basic variables remain positive. A calculation shows that this occurs when the resulting value of the entering variable is at a minimum. In other words, if the pivot column is c, then the pivot row r is chosen so that

is the minimum over all r so that arc > 0. This is called the minimum ratio test. If there is more than one row for which the minimum is achieved then a dropping variable choice rule can be used to make the determination.

Example 

Consider the linear program
Minimize

Subject to

With the addition of slack variables s and t, this is represented by the canonical tableau

where columns 5 and 6 represent the basic variables s and t and the corresponding basic feasible solution is 

Columns 2, 3, and 4 can be selected as pivot columns, for this example column 4 is selected. The values of z resulting from the choice of rows 2 and 3 as pivot rows are 10/1 = 10 and 15/3 = 5 respectively. Of these the minimum is 5, so row 3 must be the pivot row. Performing the pivot produces

Now columns 4 and 5 represent the basic variables z and s and the corresponding basic feasible solution is 

For the next step, there are no positive entries in the objective row and in fact

so the minimum value of Z is −20.

Finding an initial canonical tableau
In general, a linear program will not be given in the canonical form and an equivalent canonical tableau must be found before the simplex algorithm can start. This can be accomplished by the introduction of artificial variables. Columns of the identity matrix are added as column vectors for these variables. If the b value for a constraint equation is negative, the equation is negated before adding the identity matrix columns.  This does not change the set of feasible solutions or the optimal solution, and it ensures that the slack variables will constitute an initial feasible solution.  The new tableau is in canonical form but it is not equivalent to the original problem. So a new objective function, equal to the sum of the artificial variables, is introduced and the simplex algorithm is applied to find the minimum; the modified linear program is called the Phase I problem.

The simplex algorithm applied to the Phase I problem must terminate with a minimum value for the new objective function since, being the sum of nonnegative variables, its value is bounded below by 0. If the minimum is 0 then the artificial variables can be eliminated from the resulting canonical tableau producing a canonical tableau equivalent to the original problem. The simplex algorithm can then be applied to find the solution; this step is called Phase II. If the minimum is positive then there is no feasible solution for the Phase I problem where the artificial variables are all zero. This implies that the feasible region for the original problem is empty, and so the original problem has no solution.

Example
Consider the linear program
Minimize

Subject to

This is represented by the (non-canonical) tableau

Introduce artificial variables u and v and objective function W = u + v, giving a new tableau

The equation defining the original objective function is retained in anticipation of Phase II.

By construction, u and v are both basic variables since they are part of the initial identity matrix. However, the objective function W currently assumes that u and v are both 0. In order to adjust the objective function to be the correct value where u = 10 and v = 15, add the third and fourth rows to the first row giving

Select column 5 as a pivot column, so the pivot row must be row 4, and the updated tableau is 

Now select column 3 as a pivot column, for which row 3 must be the pivot row, to get

The artificial variables are now 0 and they may be dropped giving a canonical tableau equivalent to the original problem:

This is, fortuitously, already optimal and the optimum value for the original linear program is −130/7.

Advanced topics

Implementation

The tableau form used above to describe the algorithm lends itself to an immediate implementation in which the tableau is maintained as a rectangular (m + 1)-by-(m + n + 1) array. It is straightforward to avoid storing the m explicit columns of the identity matrix that will occur within the tableau by virtue of B being a subset of the columns of [A, I]. This implementation is referred to as the "standard simplex algorithm". The storage and computation overhead is such that the standard simplex method is a prohibitively expensive approach to solving large linear programming problems.

In each simplex iteration, the only data required are the first row of the tableau, the (pivotal) column of the tableau corresponding to the entering variable and the right-hand-side. The latter can be updated using the pivotal column and the first row of the tableau can be updated using the (pivotal) row corresponding to the leaving variable. Both the pivotal column and pivotal row may be computed directly using the solutions of linear systems of equations involving the matrix B and a matrix-vector product using A. These observations motivate the "revised simplex algorithm", for which implementations are distinguished by their invertible representation of B.

In large linear-programming problems A is typically a sparse matrix and, when the resulting sparsity of B is exploited when maintaining its invertible representation, the revised simplex algorithm is much more efficient than the standard simplex method. Commercial simplex solvers are based on the revised simplex algorithm.

Degeneracy: stalling and cycling
If the values of all basic variables are strictly positive, then a pivot must result in an improvement in the objective value. When this is always the case no set of basic variables occurs twice and the simplex algorithm must terminate after a finite number of steps. Basic feasible solutions where at least one of the basic variables is zero are called degenerate and may result in pivots for which there is no improvement in the objective value. In this case there is no actual change in the solution but only a change in the set of basic variables. When several such pivots occur in succession, there is no improvement; in large industrial applications, degeneracy is common and such "stalling" is notable. 
Worse than stalling is the possibility the same set of basic variables occurs twice, in which case, the deterministic pivoting rules of the simplex algorithm will produce an infinite loop, or "cycle". While degeneracy is the rule in practice and stalling is common, cycling is rare in practice. A discussion of an example of practical cycling occurs in Padberg. Bland's rule  prevents cycling and thus guarantees that the simplex algorithm always terminates. Another pivoting algorithm, the criss-cross algorithm never cycles on linear programs.

History-based pivot rules such as Zadeh's rule and Cunningham's rule also try to circumvent the issue of stalling and cycling by keeping track of how often particular variables are being used and then favor such variables that have been used least often.

Efficiency in the worst case
The simplex method is remarkably efficient in practice and was a great improvement over earlier methods such as Fourier–Motzkin elimination. However, in 1972, Klee and Minty gave an example, the Klee–Minty cube,  showing that the worst-case complexity of simplex method as formulated by Dantzig is exponential time. Since then, for almost every variation on the method, it has been shown that there is a family of linear programs for which it performs badly.  It is an open question if there is a variation with polynomial time, although sub-exponential pivot rules are known.

In 2014, it was proved that a particular variant of the simplex method is NP-mighty, i.e., it can be used to solve, with polynomial overhead, any problem in NP implicitly during the algorithm's execution.  Moreover, deciding whether a given variable ever enters the basis during the algorithm's execution on a given input, and determining the number of iterations needed for solving a given problem, are both NP-hard problems. At about the same time it was shown that there exists an artificial pivot rule for which computing its output is PSPACE-complete. In 2015, this was strengthened to show that computing the output of Dantzig's pivot rule is PSPACE-complete.

Efficiency in practice 
Analyzing and quantifying the observation that the simplex algorithm is efficient in practice despite its exponential worst-case complexity has led to the development of other measures of complexity. The simplex algorithm has polynomial-time average-case complexity under various probability distributions, with the precise average-case performance of the simplex algorithm depending on the choice of a probability distribution for the random matrices. Another approach to studying "typical phenomena" uses Baire category theory from general topology, and to show that (topologically) "most" matrices can be solved by the simplex algorithm in a polynomial number of steps.

Another method to analyze the performance of the simplex algorithm studies the behavior of worst-case scenarios under small perturbation – are worst-case scenarios stable under a small change (in the sense of structural stability), or do they become tractable? This area of research, called smoothed analysis, was introduced specifically to study the simplex method. Indeed, the running time of the simplex method on input with noise is polynomial in the number of variables and the magnitude of the perturbations.

Other algorithms
Other algorithms for solving linear-programming problems are described in the linear-programming article. Another basis-exchange pivoting algorithm is the criss-cross algorithm. There are polynomial-time algorithms for linear programming that use interior point methods: these include Khachiyan's ellipsoidal algorithm, Karmarkar's projective algorithm, and path-following algorithms.

Linear-fractional programming

Linear–fractional programming (LFP) is a generalization of linear programming (LP). In LP the objective function is a  linear function, while the objective function of a linear–fractional program is a ratio of two linear functions. In other words, a linear program is a fractional–linear program in which the denominator is the constant function having the value one everywhere. A linear–fractional program can be solved by a variant of the simplex algorithm or by the criss-cross algorithm.

See also 

 Criss-cross algorithm
 Cutting-plane method
 Devex algorithm
 Fourier–Motzkin elimination
 Gradient descent
 Karmarkar's algorithm
 Nelder–Mead simplicial heuristic
 Pivoting rule of Bland, which avoids cycling

Notes

References

Further reading 
These introductions are written for students of computer science and operations research:
Thomas H. Cormen, Charles E. Leiserson, Ronald L. Rivest, and Clifford Stein. Introduction to Algorithms, Second Edition. MIT Press and McGraw-Hill, 2001. . Section 29.3: The simplex algorithm, pp. 790–804.
 Frederick S. Hillier and Gerald J. Lieberman: Introduction to Operations Research, 8th edition. McGraw-Hill.

External links

An Introduction to Linear Programming and the Simplex Algorithm by Spyros Reveliotis of the Georgia Institute of Technology.
Greenberg, Harvey J., Klee–Minty Polytope Shows Exponential Time Complexity of Simplex Method the University of Colorado at Denver (1997) PDF download
Simplex Method A tutorial for Simplex Method with examples (also two-phase and M-method).
 Mathstools Simplex Calculator from www.mathstools.com
Example of Simplex Procedure for a Standard Linear Programming Problem by Thomas McFarland of the University of Wisconsin-Whitewater.
PHPSimplex: online tool to solve Linear Programming Problems by Daniel Izquierdo and Juan José Ruiz of the University of Málaga (UMA, Spain)
 simplex-m Online Simplex Solver

Optimization algorithms and methods
1947 in computing
Exchange algorithms
Linear programming
Computer-related introductions in 1947